Naugatuck Valley Community College (NVCC) is a public community college in Waterbury, Connecticut. It is one of the 13 colleges in the Connecticut State Colleges & Universities system. NVCC grants a variety of associate degrees and certificates.

Campus
The  campus has classrooms and laboratories for general and specialized use. The Learning Resource Center supports the college's mission and academic curricula through its specialized services and diverse collection of materials and online resources. The Student Center supports student activities and offers a game room, and full-service cafeteria. NVCC is home to one of Connecticut's three observatories. Each year hundreds of citizens come to campus to view the "heavens." Over 1,000 networked computers are available for student use. The campus provides cultural programs for the region in the Fine Arts Center which houses two theatres, music and dance studios, video studios, and rehearsal rooms.

In 2009, Naugatuck Valley Community College's open its New Technology Building houses several high-technology learning environments, the school's full-service Culinary Arts program, the horticultural program, and the Automotive Technology program. NVCC's Technology Hall is a 100,000 square foot, three-story glass and masonry structure. The facility provides teaching facilities for technical programs including: automotive technology, computer technology, and computer-aided design, electronics and manufacturing laboratories, classrooms, administrative offices, a horticulture program located in a new greenhouse adjacent to the new building, and facilities for the college's hospitality, food service and hotel management program. The new facility replaces seven modular buildings that were erected on the campus in 1972. It also replaces the automotive program's leased facility on Thomaston Avenue in Waterbury.

The original Founders Hall facility was the very first campus building, having been constructed in the early 1960s. The building had been recently vacated by the engineering department and was serving a hodgepodge of academic and noncredit programs at the isolated east end of campus, albeit under somewhat decrepit conditions. The New Founders Hall scheduled for completion in mid 2017. Is home to the nursing and allied health curriculum at Naugatuck Valley Community College (NVCC) had been located in aged instructional facilities constructed decades ago and was in need of an up-to-date facility that would allow the program to continue to grow and to produce the top-rated nursing and healthcare talent demanded by the region.

In 2016, Naugatuck Valley Community College will open its doors to its new 2nd Campus Location, in downtown Danbury, Connecticut. The Naugatuck Valley Community College's Danbury Campus at 190 Main Street Danbury, CT. The first floor entry is a sanctuary for the lives that will be changed here. The J-shaped information desk stands behind a stone compass inlaid into the floor. Suitably named the “Earth Compass,” this universal symbol of guidance and direction that transcends time signals intention. Enter here and you will be guided to your own greatness. On the second and third floors, newness abounds. Labs, classroom, offices, conference rooms are all taking shape from a vast expanse of the 20,000 square feet that were gutted to partition spaces in the new location.

History 
Established in 1962, Naugatuck Valley Community College is located in the bustling city of Waterbury, CT. NVCC is a two-year public college that offers numerous associate degrees, the most popular of which include General Studies, Liberal Arts and Sciences, Business Management, Nursing and much more.

Academics 
Naugatuck Valley Community College offers more than 100 associate degree and credit certificates and hundreds of non-credit courses. Students can earn different fields like Popular programs include: Liberal Arts and Sciences, General Studies and Humanities, Health Professions and Related Programs, and Business, Management, Marketing, and Related Support Services. NVCC serves 35 communities in western region of Connecticut and has a student population of more than 8,000.

References

New Technology Hall at Naugatuck Valley Community College
Construction Progresses on Naugatuck Valley's New Health Sciences Building
NVCC Opens New Campus in downtown Danbury
New bus route links Naugatuck Valley CC Campuses in Danbury and Waterbury

Buildings and structures in Waterbury, Connecticut
Community colleges in Connecticut
Educational institutions established in 1962
Universities and colleges in New Haven County, Connecticut
1962 establishments in Connecticut
Buildings and structures in Danbury, Connecticut
Education in Danbury, Connecticut